Dorylomorpha fennica is a species of fly in the family Pipunculidae

Distribution
Great Britain, Czech Republic, Denmark, Estonia, Finland, Germany, Hungary, Latvia, Slovakia, Sweden, Netherlands, Ukraine.

References

Pipunculidae
Insects described in 1979
Diptera of Europe